Clanis bilineata, the two-lined velvet hawkmoth, is a moth of the family Sphingidae first described by Francis Walker in 1866.

Distribution 
It is found in Asia, but see the subspecies section for a detailed range.

Description 
The wingspan is 94–150 mm for subspecies C. b. bilineata and 94–120 mm for subspecies C. b. tsingtauica.

Biology 
Adults of the nominate subspecies are on wing from late February until October, with peaks in April, late July-early August, and mid-September in Hong Kong. There are multiple generations per year. Subspecies C. b. tsingtauica is on wing from May to late September in Korea.

Larvae of the nominate subspecies have been recorded on Pongamia pinnata, Millettia atropurpurea and Pterocarpus marsupium in India. In southern China it has been recorded from Mucuna and Pueraria. Subspecies C. b. tsingtauica is monophagous on Fabaceae in China, including Acacia, Glycine, Mucuna, Pueraria and Robinia species. Other recorded food plants include Olea and Paulownia but these are almost certainly erroneous.

Subspecies C. b. tsingtauica is a major pest of soya beans in China, often defoliating entire fields.

Subspecies
Some authors recognise three distinct subspecies, while others regard them as synonyms:
Clanis bilineata bilineata (southern India, then from Nepal and northern India (Sikkim) across southern China to Taiwan)
Clanis bilineata formosana (Taiwan)
Clanis bilineata tsingtauica (the Russian Far East, Japan, Korea and north-eastern China, as far south as Shaanxi and Zhejiang)

References

External links

Clanis
Moths described in 1866
Moths of Japan